Fish Tales is a 12"-EP by New Zealand band the 3Ds, released in 1990.

Track listing
"First Church"
"Dream of Herge"
"Evil Kid"
"Fish Tails"
"Evocation of W.C. Fields"
"Mud Sacrifice"
"The Ball of Purple Cotton"

References

The 3Ds albums
1990 debut EPs
Flying Nun Records EPs